Located in the campus of University of Toulouse in France, École d'ingénieurs de Purpan is a Graduate Engineering school, created in 1919.
It is one of the National Polytechnic Institute of Toulouse schools.

Its different curricula lead to the following French & European degrees :
 Ingénieur Purpan (Purpan Graduate engineer Masters level program)
 Bachelor's degree
 Master's degree

Academic activities and industrial applied research are performed mainly in French and English languages. Students from a dozen of nationalities participate to the different curricula at Purpan.

Most of the 1000 graduate engineer students at Purpan live in dedicated residential buildings nearby research labs and metro public transports on a campus that is shared with 100,000 students from University of Toulouse.

Research at Purpan 
 Life sciences
 Agriculture
 Food science
 Marketing
 Management

Alumni 
 Yannick Jauzion, French former rugby union footballer

References

External links

 Official

 

 

University of Toulouse
Engineering universities and colleges in France
Education in Toulouse
Centrale Graduate School
Grandes écoles
Educational institutions established in 1919
1919 establishments in France